The spotted ray or spotted skate (Raja montagui) is a species of skate in the family Rajidae.

Distribution

The Spotted ray is found in the Atlantic Ocean from the Irish Sea to Morocco and in the Mediterranean as well.

Description 

Like all rays, the spotted ray has a flattened body with broad, wing-like pectoral fins. The body is sub-rhomboid. The dorsum is brown with dark spots.

Behaviour

The spotted ray buries itself in sand to ambush prey and avoid predators. It mainly feeds on crustaceans, polychaetes, teleosts and molluscs.

Life cycle 

Spotted rays are oviparous with eggs laid in summer.

See also

References

External links
 
Fishbase Database: Raja montagui

spotted ray
Fish of the East Atlantic
Fish of the Mediterranean Sea
Fish of the North Sea
spotted ray